Bryan Schmidt (born July 27, 1981) is an American professional ice hockey player who is currently playing for Nottingham Panthers of the EIHL.

Awards and honors

Regular season MVP, Merrimack College (2004–05)

Records

Merrimack College
Most goals in a single season (defense): 13 (2004–05)
Most career goals (defense): 34 (2003–06)
Fastest consecutive goals: 0:06 (with Steve Crusco vs. Holy Cross, 1/24/2003)

Career statistics

Notes

References
2007–08 Merrimack Hockey Record Book. Merrimack College. Retrieved 2011-01-07.

External links

1981 births
Cincinnati Cyclones (ECHL) players
Kassel Huskies players
Living people
Manchester Monarchs (AHL) players
Merrimack Warriors men's ice hockey players
Milwaukee Admirals players
EHC München players
Nottingham Panthers players
HDD Olimpija Ljubljana players
Providence Bruins players
Reading Royals players
South Carolina Stingrays players
SønderjyskE Ishockey players
Starbulls Rosenheim players
Storhamar Dragons players
Tri-City Storm players
Ice hockey players from Minnesota
American men's ice hockey defensemen